This article covers the 2016–17 season for Laçi. They'll participate in the Kategoria Superiore and the Albanian Cup.

Squad

First team squad
.

Transfers

In

Out

Pre-season and friendlies

Competitions

Overall

Overview

Kategoria Superiore

League table

Results summary

Results by round

Matches

Albanian Cup

Notes

References

External links
Soccerway

Laci
KF Laçi seasons